Great Auclum National Speed Hill Climb was a motorcar course close to Burghfield Common in the English county of Berkshire.

It was based in the grounds of a large country house, formerly owned by a family connected to Huntley and Palmer – the famous biscuit manufacturers at nearby Reading, Berkshire. The hill climb was organised by the Hants and Berks Motor Club as a National Speed Hill Climb. The course travelled nearly as far downhill as it did up, with a finish almost level with the start. Motor Sport reported : "The ¼-mile course embraces two sharp corners, one banked, and a twisty section, so that a premium is set on initial acceleration and low-speed cornering."

Early days
Prior to World War Two at least one event took place at Burghfield, as the event was then known. In 1939 Motor Sport listed a forthcoming event: 27 May 1939, Sporting O.D.C. Speed event, Burghfield, which was cancelled. An event took place in June organised by the Frazer-Nash and Frazer-Nash B.M.W. C.C. and Sporting O.D.C. "The postponed speed hill-climb up the private drive of Neil Gardner's (sic ) house at Burghfield Common happened on 24 June, complete with adjacent funfair and Lord Nuffield to present the prizes." P.W. Neale set fastest time of the day in 27.0 secs "winning the 2-litre class from Fane's B.M.W."

Racing resumed in 1947 when: "Salvadori's monoposto Alfa-Romeo won its class in 25.2 sec., but couldn't be extended, and it was L.J.D. Bartlett's home-brewed Mercury Special which made f.t.d. in 23.5 sec." The following year Ken Wharton's Wharton Special "beautifully crisp and fearlessly handled, made f.t.d. in 23.34 sec., beating Stirling Moss (23.46 sec.), who drove absolutely superbly getting into third gear in his Cooper 500,..."

The end
The last event was held in 1974 and the site has now been re-developed for housing. However the course itself is still there as it was the rear drive to Great Auclum house, which has now been redeveloped. The track is in a poor state of repair and very overgrown.

Great Auclum Hill Climb past winners

Key: R = Course Record.

Course

See also
 Lewes Speed Trials
 Westbrook Hay Hill Climb

Footnotes

External links
mgcars website archive
Map showing location of Great Auclum

Hillclimbs
History of Berkshire
Defunct motorsport venues in England
Defunct sports venues in Berkshire
Burghfield